Southery is a village and civil parish in Norfolk, England, which covers an area of  and had a population of 1,324 at the 2011 Census. For local government purposes, it falls within the district of King's Lynn and West Norfolk.

The village's name means 'southerly island'.

Gallery

Notes 

http://kepn.nottingham.ac.uk/map/place/Norfolk/Southery

External links
Village Web site Southery.Com

Villages in Norfolk
Civil parishes in Norfolk
King's Lynn and West Norfolk